Guanine nucleotide-binding protein G(I)/G(S)/G(T) subunit beta-2 is a protein that in humans is encoded by the GNB2 gene.

Heterotrimeric guanine nucleotide-binding proteins (G proteins), which integrate signals between receptors and effector proteins, are composed of an alpha, a beta, and a gamma subunit. These subunits are encoded by families of related genes. 

This gene encodes a beta subunit. Beta subunits are important regulators of alpha subunits, as well as of certain signal transduction receptors and effectors. This gene contains a trinucleotide (CCG) repeat length polymorphism in its 5' UTR.

References

Further reading